Valentin Savich Bibik (19 July 1940 – 7 July 2003) was a Ukrainian composer, teacher and professor. 

Honored Artist of Ukraine.

Biography 
In 1966, Valentin Bibik graduated from the Kharkiv National Kotlyarevsky University of Arts, with Dmitri Klebanov.

From 1966 to 1994, he taught at the Kharkiv National Kotlyarevsky University of Arts, from 1971 he worked there as a senior lecturer, from 1990 to 1994 he was a professor and head of the department of composition and instrumentation.

From 1968, Bibik was a member of the Union of Soviet Composers, and from 1989 to 1994 he was chairman of the Kharkiv organization of the Union of Composers of Ukraine.

From 1994 to 1998, he was a professor, head of the Department of Musical Arts at the St. Petersburg Humanities University of Trade Unions, and professor at the St. Petersburg Academy of Arts.

Since 1998, Bibik has been a professor of composition at the Academy of Music of Tel Aviv University.

He died in Tel Aviv in 2003.

Achievements 
He composed an opera based on Flight (play). He composed a Dies Irae, 39 Variations for piano. He composed a Trio for Clarinet, Cello and Piano. His Cello Concerto No. 2 (2001) and Evening Music (2002) were performed by the New Juilliard Ensemble. His 37 Preludes and Fugues, was performed by Nextet.

Valentin Bibik was a Laureate of the Second International Composer's Competition named after Mariana and Ivanna Kots for the symphonic work "Crying and Prayer", dedicated to the memory of the victims of the Holodomor of the 1930s (Kyiv, 1992); ACUM Award Winner; Composer of the Year (Israel, 2001).

References

External links 
 Valentin Bibik (1940-2003)

2003 deaths
1940 births
Place of birth missing
Ukrainian composers
20th-century classical composers